Sydenham Hospital for Communicable Diseases, also known as Montebello State Hospital or Montebello State Chronic Disease Hospital, was a hospital and is a national historic district in Baltimore, Maryland, United States. It was originally constructed in 1922–1924, and the campus consists of seven Italian Renaissance Revival style buildings: the main hospital building, the administration building, the kitchen, the nurses’ home, the laundry with servants’ quarters above, the garage, and the powerhouse. A residence for the Director of Medical Research was added in 1939. The campus was designed by noted Baltimore architect Edward Hughes Glidden.

It was added to the National Register of Historic Places in 1998.

The patient records of Sydenham Hospital are held at the National Library of Medicine and showcase nature and treatment of communicable diseases in the pre-antibiotic era.

The main hospital building was demolished in 2013 and an empty lot now sits in its place.

References

External links
, including photo from 1998, at Maryland Historical Trust

Hospital buildings completed in 1924
Government buildings completed in 1924
Hospital buildings on the National Register of Historic Places in Baltimore
Historic districts in Baltimore
Hospitals in Baltimore
Defunct hospitals in Maryland
Renaissance Revival architecture in Maryland
Italian Renaissance Revival architecture in the United States
Historic districts on the National Register of Historic Places in Maryland